Lily Lake is a lake in Fulton County in the U.S. State of New York. It is located southwest of the Hamlet of Canada Lake. Fish species present in the lake are northern pike, largemouth bass, black bullhead, rock bass, yellow perch, and pumpkinseed sunfish. There is access via Sprite Creek from Canada Lake.

References

Lakes of New York (state)
Lakes of Fulton County, New York